Anton Anatolyevich Bobyor (born 28 September 1982) is a former Russian football midfielder who spent most of his career in PFC Krylia Sovetov Samara.

Career
Bobyor spent twelve seasons with Krylia Sovetov Samara and has made the most Russian league appearances in club history (274).

International career
Bobyor played his only international game for Russia on 27 March 2002 in a friendly against Estonia.

Career statistics

References

External links
  Profile

1982 births
People from Naberezhnye Chelny
Living people
Russian footballers
Russia under-21 international footballers
Russia international footballers
Association football midfielders
FC KAMAZ Naberezhnye Chelny players
PFC Krylia Sovetov Samara players
FC Mordovia Saransk players
Russian Premier League players
Sportspeople from Tatarstan